Elections of the provincial, city and county people's committees(도 시 군 인민위원회 선거) were held in Soviet-occupied North Korea on November 3, 1946. 

The elections were held for the Pyongyang municipal people's committee(평양 특별시 인민위원회), six provincial people's committees, 12 city people's committees, and 90 county people's committees.

The total turnout for the election is 99.6%, with 97% of the total voters participating in the elections of the provincial people's committees, 95.4% in the elections of the city people's committees, and 96.9% in the elections of the county people's committees.

A total of 3,459 deputies were elected to the provincial, city and county people's committees, with 1,102 deputies being affiliated with the Workers' Party of North Korea, 352 with the Korean Democratic Party, 253 with the Chondoist Chongu Party, and 1,753 being independents.

Among the 3,459 deputies elected were 510 workers, 1,256 peasants, 1,056 office clerks, 145 merchants, 73 businessmen, 311 intellectuals, 94 religious people, and 14 former landlords. 453 of the 3,459 deputies were women. The country's future president, Kim Il-sung, was among those elected. He was elected from Samdung-myon(modern day Samdŭng-ri), Kangdong County in South Phyongan Province.

References

1946 in North Korea
North Korea
Local elections in North Korea
November 1946 events in Asia